Carroll McCray (born February 4, 1962) is an American football coach. He was the head football coach at Gardner–Webb University from 2013 to 2019. McCray was the head football coach at Austin Peay State University from 2003 to 2006 and North Greenville University in 2012.

After serving as an assistant coach at various schools for nearly two decades, on January 21, 2003, McCray was hired as the head coach at Austin Peay State University. On February 19, 2007, he resigned as the Governors' head coach and days later was introduced as the new offensive line coach at Furman. During his four-year tenure with the Governors, McCray had an overall record of 11 wins and 33 losses (11–33).

McCray stayed at Furman through the 2010 season, and followed Bobby Lamb to Mercer to serve as offensive line coach with the Bears for the 2011 season. On January 18, 2012, McCray was hired by North Greenville to succeed Jamey Chadwell as the head coach of the Crusaders.  He was hired in January 2013 to serve as head coach of his alma mater, Gardner–Webb University after his only season at North Greenville. He was then fired from Gardner–Webb on November 24, 2019. He finished with a record of 27 wins and 53 losses (27–53).

Head coaching record

References

External links
 Gardner–Webb profile

1962 births
Living people
American football offensive linemen
Appalachian State Mountaineers football coaches
Austin Peay Governors football coaches
Furman Paladins football coaches
Gardner–Webb Runnin' Bulldogs football coaches
Gardner–Webb Runnin' Bulldogs football players
Mercer Bears football coaches
Mississippi State Bulldogs football coaches
North Greenville Crusaders football coaches
Samford Bulldogs football coaches
South Carolina Gamecocks football coaches